The Junction Boys is a 2002 American made-for-television sports drama film written and directed by Mike Robe, based on Jim Dent's 2001 book of the same name. It is about the Junction Boys, and stars Tom Berenger as Bear Bryant. It aired on ESPN on December 14, 2002.

Cast

Production
Filming took place in Sydney, Australia, for budgetary reasons. Except for the American Berenger, the cast members were Australian, and were coached by a Texas-born dialect coach to use correct Texan accents. To bypass the differences between American and Australian rules football, the filmmakers recruited players from American football clubs in Australia for the football scenes.

References

External links
  at ESPN Original Entertainment
 

2002 television films
2002 films
2002 biographical drama films
2000s American films
2000s biographical drama films
2000s English-language films
2000s sports drama films
American biographical drama films
American drama television films
American football films
American sports drama films
Biographical television films
Biographical films about educators
Biographical films about sportspeople
Cultural depictions of players of American football
ESPN Films films
Films based on non-fiction books
Films directed by Mike Robe
Films scored by Steve Dorff
Films set in 1954
Films set in Texas
Films shot in Sydney
Sports television films
Television films based on books
Texas A&M Aggies football